Huazhou District, formerly Hua County or Huaxian, is a district of Weinan, Shaanxi province, China. It was upgraded from a county to a district in 2015.

History 
During the Western Zhou period, the area belonged to the State of Zheng.

During the Spring and Autumn period, the State of Qin established  in the area of present-day Huazhou.

Zheng County was put under the jurisdiction of Hua Prefecture.

Early in the Yuan dynasty, Zheng County was merged into Hua Prefecture.

The epicenter of the 1556 Shaanxi earthquake was in Huazhou District.

In 1913, Hua Prefecture was re-organized as Hua County.

On May 23, 1949, the area was taken by forces of the People's Liberation Army. In 1958, Hua County was placed under the jurisdiction of Weinan County, which soon became Weinan Prefecture in 1961, and was upgraded to a prefecture-level city in 1994.

In October 2015, Hua County was upgraded to Huazhou District.

Geography 
Huazhou District is located in the eastern Qin Mountains, and along the southern banks of the Wei River. The district is also home to a number of smaller rivers which flow into the Wei, such as the Chishui River, the Yuxian River, the Shidi River, and others.

Climate 

Administrative divisions
Huazhou District administers one subdistrict and nine towns.

The district's sole subdistrict is Huazhou Subdistrict.

Economy 
Huazhou District has significant mineral deposits of molybdenum, gold, silver, iron, and granite.

Transportation 
National Highway 310 runs through the district, as does the Longhai railway.

Notable people 

 Guo Ziyi, Tang dynasty general
 Hu Lien, Chinese Nationalist general
 , Chinese Nationalist general

Attractions

External links
Huazhou Government's official website

References

Districts of Shaanxi
Weinan